Ambev, formally Companhia de Bebidas das Américas, is a Brazilian brewing company now merged into Anheuser-Busch InBev. Its name translates to "Beverage Company of the Americas", hence the "Ambev" abbreviation. It was created on July 1, 1999, with the merger of two breweries, Brahma and Antarctica. The merger was approved by the board of directors of the Brazilian Administrative Council for Economic Defense (CADE) on March 30, 2000. The organization's headquarters are in São Paulo, Brazil. It is one of the largest companies by market capitalization in Brazil and in the Southern hemisphere.

Overview 
Ambev operates in 18 countries in the Americas and its products include beers such as Antarctica, Bogotá Beer Company, Brahma, Bohemia, Stella Artois and soft drinks like Guaraná Antarctica, Soda Antarctica, Sukita and the innovations H2OH! and Guarah. The largest PepsiCo bottler outside the United States, it sells and distributes PepsiCo products in Brazil and other Latin American countries, includes Pepsi, Lipton Ice Tea and Gatorade by franchise agreement. According to an analyst at "Share Market Updates" in October 2016, the company operated through Latin America North, Latin America South, and Canada segments.

Ambev offers beers primarily under the Skol, Brahma, and Antarctica brands. The company also provides carbonated soft drinks, bottled water, isotonic beverages, energy drinks, and ready-to-drink teas under the Guaraná Antarctica, Guaraná Antarctica Black, Gatorade, H2OH!, Lipton Iced Tea, Fusion, Monster, Red Rock, Pepsi-Cola, and Seven Up brands."

In 2004, Ambev merged with Belgian company Interbrew to form InBev. In 2008, InBev merged with American company Anheuser-Busch to form Anheuser-Busch InBev. Ambev S.A. is currently a subsidiary of Interbrew International B.V., which is in turn a subsidiary of Anheuser-Busch InBev SA/NV.

See also

 Cervecería Quilmes — (Ambev has a 91.18% controlling interest)
 Cervecería Nacional Dominicana — 51% owner
 Brasil Kirin (competitor)
 Grupo Petrópolis (competitor)
 Heineken International (competitor)
 Heineken (Brazil) (competitor)

References

External links
  
 The Ambev stock chart
 Ambev suit

Drink companies of Brazil
Manufacturing companies based in São Paulo
Beer in Brazil
2013 initial public offerings
Companies listed on B3 (stock exchange)
PepsiCo bottlers
AB InBev
Brazilian subsidiaries of foreign companies